St. Mark is a Roman Catholic church in Stratford, Connecticut, part of the Diocese of Bridgeport. The parish is located in Stratford's North End and was founded in 1960 by Bishop Lawrence Shehan.

Facilities 
Besides the church itself the grounds include an adoration chapel convent, social hall/gymnasium, kitchen, and religious education office.

School
The parish includes an elementary and middle school that hosts over 200 students from pre-K through eighth grade. In 2009 the school was named a U.S. Department of Education Blue Ribbon School of Excellence.

References

External links 
 St Mark - website
 Diocese of Bridgeport

Roman Catholic churches in Connecticut
Buildings and structures in Stratford, Connecticut
Roman Catholic Diocese of Bridgeport
Churches in Fairfield County, Connecticut